The women's long jump event at the 1968 European Indoor Games was held on 9 March in Madrid.

Results

References

Long jump at the European Athletics Indoor Championships
Long